Zona Roja (English: Red Zone) is a 1976 Mexican film directed by Emilio Fernández and starring Fanny Cano.

Plot
In a whorehouse in  Acapulco, lives Leonor (Fanny Cano), a young and beautiful woman who is awaiting to reunite with an old lover. Suddenly, the man reappears to take her away from her life of vice. But the debt owed by Leonor to the "Madame" of the house causes a series of conflicts.

Reception
The film shocked audiences with the explicit scenes of nudity of the actresses playing the prostitute roles.

External links
 

1976 films
1970s Spanish-language films
Mexican erotic drama films
1970s erotic drama films
Films directed by Emilio Fernández
Films about prostitution in Mexico
1976 drama films
1970s Mexican films